Christopher Michael Peters (born January 28, 1972) is a retired Major League Baseball pitcher. He played during six seasons at the major league level for the Pittsburgh Pirates and Montreal Expos.

Career
He was drafted by the Pirates in the 37th round of the  amateur draft.

References

1972 births
Living people
American expatriate baseball players in Canada
Augusta GreenJackets players
Baseball players from Pennsylvania
Calgary Cannons players
Camden Riversharks players
Carolina Mudcats players
Columbus Clippers players
Erie SeaWolves players
Louisville RiverBats players
Lynchburg Hillcats players
Major League Baseball pitchers
Montreal Expos players
Nashville Sounds players
Newark Bears players
Pennsylvania Road Warriors players
People from Bethel Park, Pennsylvania
Pittsburgh Pirates players
Salem Buccaneers players
Welland Pirates players